Ante Rožić (born 8 March 1986 in Bankstown, New South Wales) is a Croatian retired football player who last played for Suphanburi FC in the Thai Premier League.

Early life
Born to Croatian parents in Australia. Rožić moved to Croatia in 1996. His father was a Yugoslav international footballer, Vedran Rožić.

Career

Croatia
Rožić came through the youth system at HNK Hajduk Split but never broke into the first team. For the 2005–06 season he was sent on loan to 2 HNL club NK Mosor, where he played 15 games, scoring 3 goals. The first part of 2006–07 season saw him play in 1 HNL for HNK Cibalia before moving to NK Zadar in the 2 HNL for the remainder of the season. He started the 2007–08 season with NK Zadar before moving to 2 HNL side HNK Trogir, where he became a first team regular.

CS Sedan Ardennes
Rožić signed a two-year contract with French club CS Sedan Ardennes on 25 January 2009.

Arka Gdynia
In July 2010, Rožić joined Arka Gdynia on a two-year contract. He was released by the club on 30 June 2011.

Gold Coast United
On 10 August 2011, Gold Coast United FC announced Rožić as their final signing to complete their squad for the upcoming season.

National team
Rožić played one match for the Croatian U-20 team in 2006.

References

External links
 
 
 

1986 births
Living people
Soccer players from Sydney
Australian people of Croatian descent
Association football defenders
Croatian footballers
Croatia youth international footballers
HNK Hajduk Split players
NK Mosor players
HNK Cibalia players
NK Zadar players
HNK Trogir players
CS Sedan Ardennes players
Arka Gdynia players
Gold Coast United FC players
FC Metalurh Zaporizhzhia players
Ante Rozic
First Football League (Croatia) players
Croatian Football League players
Ligue 2 players
Ekstraklasa players
A-League Men players
Ukrainian Premier League players
Croatian expatriate footballers
Expatriate footballers in France
Croatian expatriate sportspeople in France
Expatriate footballers in Poland
Croatian expatriate sportspeople in Poland
Expatriate footballers in Ukraine
Croatian expatriate sportspeople in Ukraine
Expatriate footballers in Thailand
Croatian expatriate sportspeople in Thailand